Xanthomonas phaseoli, sometimes referred to as Bean Blight is a species of bacteria.

References 

Xanthomonadales